Crockett High School may refer to:

 Crockett High School (Austin, Texas)
 Crockett High School (Crockett, Texas)
 Crockett High School (Detroit, Michigan) - Detroit Public Schools
 David Crockett High School (Tennessee)